Windstream Holdings, Inc., also doing business as Windstream Communications or Windstream, is a provider of voice and data network communications (broadband, VoIP, MPLS), and managed services (virtual servers, managed firewall, data storage, cloud-based voice, etc.), to businesses in the United States.  The company also offers residential broadband, phone and digital streaming TV services to consumers within its coverage area.  It is the ninth largest residential telephone provider in the country with service covering more than 8.1 million people in 21 states.

The company was formed in 2006, when Alltel's local telephone service merged with Valor Communications Group out of part of GTE (now part of Verizon's) local telephone business in the Southwestern United States.

Windstream is a partner with DirecTV, offering satellite service to its customers.

History
Valor Telecom was formed in 2000 to take over GTE Southwest assets that Verizon was selling following its acquisition of GTE.

The company went public in 2005, under the name Valor Communications Group, Inc.

Change to Windstream
In 2006, Windstream Corporation formed through the spinoff of Alltel's landline business and merger with VALOR Communications Group.

Local Insight Yellow Pages

Local Insight Yellow Pages, Inc. was founded in 1984 as Alltel Publishing Corporation, and subsequently became Windstream's official directory publishing agent.

Windstream Yellow Pages published directories for former Alltel wireline, as well as directories for TDS Telecom and KLM Telephone customers, as well numerous smaller independent telephone companies.  In 99% of the markets, the telephone directory published by Windstream Yellow Pages is for the Incumbent Local Exchange Carrier (ILEC) and is not a competing overlay directory.

Upon completion of the sale to Windstream Regatta Holdings, Inc., Windstream Yellow Pages was renamed Local Insight Yellow Pages. In 2007, LIR Holdings acquired CBD Media, the former advertising & publishing division of Cincinnati Bell.

In July 2009, Local Insight Regatta Holdings merged Local Insight Yellow Pages into The Berry Company, which it had acquired from AT&T.

Bond default and bankruptcy
On February 15, 2019, the U.S. District Court of the Southern District of New York ruled that Windstream had defaulted on some of its bonds. Consequent to the ruling, Windstream stock lost about 60% of its value.

On February 25, 2019, Windstream filed for Chapter 11 bankruptcy.

Launch of Kinetic
In February 2019, Windstream launched Kinetic. 

Kinetic TV requires a Kinetic Internet subscription with speeds of 10 Mbps or greater and runs atop MobiTV’s Connect platform. The app will be available for connected devices, smart TVs, PCs, tablets and smartphones. Kinetic TV packages include Kinetic TV Viewing, Kinetic TV Replay, Kinetic Cloud DVR, and Kinetic Video On-Demand, placing it in direct competition with DirecTV Now, Sling TV, Hulu with Live TV, YouTube TV, Philo, and others. 

MobiTV announced that it had secured hosted streaming delivery rights from another 90 networks including Bloomberg Television, Discovery, MGM HD, Newsmax, Outside TV, Smithsonian Channel, Stingray Music, Univision, and others, bringing its total to more than 350 networks.

Kinetic by Windstream provides services to residential and business customers in 18 states. Kinetic services includes high-speed Internet, entertainment, phone and security products for homes and businesses.

On April 1, 2022 Windstream discontinued Kinetic TV and replaced it with the DirectTV stream service.

Expansion and sales
On May 29, 2007, the company announced that it would acquire CT Communications for $585 million. The acquisition would result in an addition of approximately 158,000 access lines and 29,000 broadband customers, nearly doubling the company's presence in North Carolina. The sale closed August 31, 2007. The telephone operating company was renamed Windstream Concord Telephone.

In 2007, Windstream sold off its Windstream Yellow Pages unit to a private equity firm, who renamed the unit Local Insight Yellow Pages. The company has been dissolved into The Berry Company.

On May 11, 2009, the company announced that it would acquire D&E Communications of Ephrata, Pennsylvania for approximately $330 million. The acquisition would result in an addition of approximately 165,000 access lines and 44,000 high speed internet customers. The acquisition would greatly expand the company's presence in Pennsylvania, including significant expansion of its CLEC presence in seven markets in the state, including State College, PA, home of Pennsylvania State University.  The transaction closed November 10, 2009.

On November 24, 2009, the company announced that it would acquire Iowa Telecom for $1.1 billion. The acquisition would result in an addition 256,000 access lines, about 95,000 high-speed Internet customers and about 26,000 digital TV customers, adding rural Iowa and Minnesota to the company.

On February 8, 2010, the company acquired Nuvox, a company formed from a merger of NuVox Communications, NewSouth Communications, FDN Communications, Gabriel Communications and Trivergent Communications.

On August 17, 2010, the company announced that it had entered into a definitive agreement to acquire Q-Comm Corporation in a transaction valued at approximately $782 million. This includes Q-Comm’s wholly owned subsidiaries Kentucky Data Link, Inc. (KDL), a fiber services provider in 22 states, Cinergy Metronet, and Norlight, Inc., a CLEC  primarily serving the Midwest. Both KDL and Norlight are based in Evansville, IN. Q-Comm subsidiary nGenX will be spun off as independent companies prior to the close of the deal.

In November 2010, the company announced that it would acquire Hosted Solutions for $310 million. Hosted Solutions is a North Carolina-based managed hosting, cloud and colocation provider with a footprint of five datacenters in Cary, Raleigh and Charlotte, North Carolina as well as Boston, Massachusetts.

In August 2011, the company announced that it would acquire PAETEC Holding Corp., a Rochester, New York-based telecommunications company. As of December 1, 2011, this acquisition has been completed.

After the market closed on Friday April 24, 2015 legacy rural telecom provider Windstream Holdings, Inc. (NASDAQ: WIN) announced that it had completed the tax-free spinoff of "select telecommunications network assets," into Communications Sales and Leasing Inc. (CS&L). This new CS&L REIT is to trade under ticker symbol (NASDAQ: CSAL). The transaction is also the catalyst for changes in the Windstream dividend and a call for a one-for-six (1:6) reverse stock split. In 2016, Windsteam sold the remaining shares in CSAL.

In January 2016, the company announced it was extending its 100 Gigabit Ethernet (100G) network from New Jersey data center operator NJFX's presence at Tata Communications' Cable Landing Station (CLS) in Wall Township, N.J., to Ashburn, Virginia's Internet hub.

On November 7, 2016, Windstream announced a merger with EarthLink for about $1.1 billion in stock.

On April 13, 2017, Windstream announced that it would acquire Broadview Networks in an all-cash transaction valued at $227 million.

On February 25, 2019, Windstream filed for Chapter 11 bankruptcy protection in response to a February 15th judgment against the company for $310 million. 

In September 2020, emerging from bankruptcy as a privately held company, Windstream successfully completed its financial restructuring process and reduced its debt by over $4 billion.

Change of CEO

On December 11, 2014 Windstream's CEO from 2006 to 2014, Jeffery R. (Jeff) Gardner, was replaced by Tony Thomas.  Jeffery R. Gardner stayed on as an adviser and member of the Board of Directors through Feb 1, 2015.

See also
List of United States telephone companies
Windstream Missouri

References

External links

Windstream Internet
Windstream Business
Windstream Coverage Map

Companies formerly listed on the Nasdaq
Companies traded over-the-counter in the United States
Companies that filed for Chapter 11 bankruptcy in 2019
 
Companies based in Arkansas
Companies based in Little Rock, Arkansas
Communications in Arkansas
Telecommunications companies of the United States
American companies established in 2006
Telecommunications companies established in 2006
2006 establishments in Arkansas
2005 initial public offerings